The 2005-06 Birinci Lig season, started on October 15, 2005. It was the 46th season since the Birinci Lig's establishment.

League table

2005 in Northern Cyprus
2006 in Northern Cyprus
North
2005-06